The Brooks Catsup Bottle water tower, trademarked "The World's Largest Catsup Bottle", is a water tower south of Collinsville, Illinois. It is claimed to be the largest catsup bottle in the world. As a prime example of mid-20th-century novelty architecture, it is listed on the National Register of Historic Places. The tower is most notable in its capacity as a regional landmark and as a roadside attraction.

Construction 
The water tower was constructed in 1949 by the W.E. Caldwell Company. The tower was built to supply water to the nearby Brooks catsup plant owned by the G.S. Suppiger Company. The president of the company, Gerhart S. Suppiger, is credited with the suggestion that the water tower be designed to resemble one of the company's catsup bottles.

Restoration 
In 1993, the owners of the Brooks plant, Curtice-Burns, Inc., prepared to sell the property. It offered the water tower to the nearby city of Collinsville, but the city declined to purchase it due to the high projected cost of repairs and restoration. Over the course of two years, volunteers raised $80,000 to "repair, strip, and paint" the aging structure. The project was completed in June 1995, and the structure was added to the National Register of Historic Places in August 2002.

In popular culture 
The tower was featured in A Program About Unusual Buildings & Other Roadside Stuff, a 2004 PBS documentary by Rick Sebak of WQED.

It was mentioned as a place Bella should visit in The Twilight Saga: Eclipse.

References

External links 

 The World's Largest Catsup Bottle Official Web Site and Fan Club

Buildings and structures on U.S. Route 66
Ketchup
Towers completed in 1949
Water towers in Illinois
National Register of Historic Places in Madison County, Illinois
Novelty buildings in Illinois
Individual signs in the United States
Water towers on the National Register of Historic Places in Illinois
Individual signs on the National Register of Historic Places
1949 establishments in Illinois